Fuendejalón is a municipality located in the province of Zaragoza, Aragon, Spain. According to the 2010 census the municipality has a population of 953 inhabitants.

The Sierra del Bollón range rises west of the town.

See also
Campo de Borja
List of municipalities in Zaragoza

References

External links 

 Fuendejalón in Campo de Borja
 San Juan Bautista Church - Description and pictures

Municipalities in the Province of Zaragoza